Hungary competed at the 2022 Winter Olympics in Beijing, China, from 4 to 20 February 2022.

Hungary's team consisted of 14 athletes (8 men and six women) competing in five sports. Márton Kékesi and Zita Tóth were the country's flagbearer during the opening ceremony. Meanwhile cross-country skier Adam Konya was the flagbearer during the closing ceremony.

Medalists

The following Hungarian competitors won medals at the games. In the discipline sections below, the medalists' names are bolded.

|  style="text-align:left; width:78%; vertical-align:top;"|

|  style="text-align:left; width:22%; vertical-align:top;"|

Multiple medalists
The following competitors won multiple medals at the 2022 Olympic Games.

Competitors
The following is a list of the number of competitors participating at the Games per sport/discipline.

Alpine skiing

By meeting the basic qualification standards Hungary qualified one male and one female alpine skier.

Cross-country skiing

By meeting the basic qualification standards Hungary qualified one male and one female cross-country skier.

Distance

Sprint

Figure skating

In the 2021 World Figure Skating Championships in Stockholm, Sweden, Hungary secured one quota in pairs competitions.

On 18 February 2022, Ioulia Chtchetinina and Márk Magyar withdrew prior to the short program due to Magyar's positive COVID-19 test.

Mixed

Short track speed skating 

Hungary has qualified in the men's and mixed relays, qualifying five male and two female athletes.

Men

Qualification legend: FA - Qualify to medal final; FB - Qualify to consolation final; ADV - Advanced on referee decision

Women

Qualification legend: FA - Qualify to medal final; FB - Qualify to consolation final

Mixed

Qualification legend: FA - Qualify to medal final; FB - Qualify to consolation final

Snowboarding

Hungary secured one quota in women's halfpipe.

Freestyle

References

Nations at the 2022 Winter Olympics
2022
Winter Olympics